Jakob Engel-Schmidt (born 24 October 1983) is a Danish politician and Member of the Folketing from the Moderates. Since 15 December 2022 he has been Minister for Culture in the Frederiksen II Cabinet.

Political career 
In the 2009 Danish local elections, he ran unsuccessfully in Rudersdal Municipality.

He was a Venstre parliamentary candidate in the Lyngby constituency in the 2011 Danish general election and won 2,234 personal votes, but not enough to win a seat. The radio host   endorsed him, calling him "an excellent liberal candidate".

On 15 August 2013, he instead entered the Folketing as a substitute for Gitte Lillelund Bech who resigned from parliament.

In 2022, he left Venstre and joined the Moderates. On 15 December, he was appointed minister of culture in Mette Frederiksen's second cabinet.

References 

Living people
1983 births
Danish Culture Ministers
21st-century Danish politicians
Members of the Folketing 2022–2026
Venstre (Denmark) politicians
Moderates (Denmark) politicians